The siege of Nisibis took place in 573 when the Eastern Roman (Byzantine) Empire, under Emperor Justin II, besieged the Sasanian city of Nisibis. The Sasanians successfully defended the city and defeated the Roman force.

In line with "Justinianic model", the Romans mobilized garrisoned engineers for the attack, and ordered them to perform a "very complex siege".

The reason behind the Roman rout at Nisibis was reportedly due to quarreling amongst the Roman officers. According to the Syriac chronicles, however, the Sasanian forces were able to delay the Roman army, allowing them to prepare for extensive defense. An account also cited a failure of intelligence from Arab clients so that the Romans were unaware of the Sasanian army's movement to the Euphrates junction with the Khabur. This army attacked the Romans from the rear.

After the siege was lifted, the Sasanians used the Roman trebuchets that were left behind at the successful siege of Dara, later that year. This particular siege lasted six months and the victory gave Khosrow I another important fortress in the eastern Mesopotamia in addition to Nisibis.

References

Sources
 
 

573
570s conflicts
Nisibis 573
Nisibis 573
Nisibis 573
6th century in the Byzantine Empire
6th century in Iran
570s in the Byzantine Empire
573